Clean and Sober is a 1988 American drama film directed by Glenn Gordon Caron and starring Michael Keaton as a real estate agent struggling with a substance abuse problem. This film served as Keaton's first dramatic departure from comedies. The supporting cast includes Kathy Baker, M. Emmet Walsh, Morgan Freeman, Luca Bercovici and Tate Donovan.

Ron Howard, who previously directed Keaton in the comedies Night Shift (1982) and Gung Ho (1986), served as co-producer.

Plot

Daryl Poynter is a successful but self-destructive Philadelphia real estate salesman who is addicted to cocaine. He embezzles $92,000 of his company's money from an escrow account and then loses $52,000 to his addiction and the stock market.  Waking up one morning next to a woman who suffered a heart attack from a cocaine overdose, he tries to cover up the drug use, but the police make it clear that they know what happened. There is also the matter of the company's money. Daryl goes to the airport to try to flee the country but his credit card is declined and he has no cash. His colleague Martin also refuses to put him up for a couple of weeks. Daryl then learns of a drug rehabilitation program on the radio which lasts about a month and which guarantees anonymity. He checks in, figuring he can hide out there. While in rehab he meets Craig, a tough but supportive drug rehabilitation counselor. With great difficulty, Craig helps Daryl to realize he is an addict and that his life is complete chaos. He says to him, "The best way to break old habits is to make new ones."

At a 12-step meeting, Daryl tries to get "eligible" women to sponsor him, but they turn him down. He then meets the older, reformed addict Richard Dirks who will act as his sponsor. Over lunch doing Step 4, Richard eventually encourages Daryl to confess at work what he's done with the money. He is promptly fired. Daryl becomes attracted to a fellow patient, a woman named Charlie Standers. She is a steel foundry worker who is addicted to alcohol and cocaine. Charlie is involved in an abusive relationship with her boyfriend Lenny, a fellow addict to whom Charlie acts as a codependent. Daryl falls in love with Charlie and urges her to leave Lenny. He finally succeeds in persuading her to leave, only to witness Lenny's manipulative way of winning her back. Daryl tries to remain in Charlie's life to help her stay sober. After another fight with Lenny, she leaves the house, does a hit of cocaine (and perhaps return to Daryl) and is killed in a car accident. In despair, Daryl also feels a strong temptation to return to drugs. He visits Richard, who talks him out of it. Richard also explains he couldn't have saved Charlie as only the addict can take responsibility for themself. Near the story's end, Daryl, confused but hopeful and reborn, accepts his 30 Day Sobriety Coin in front of an audience of fellow members, as he tells his story.

The film ends with a distorted shot of cars taking off into the night.

Cast
 Michael Keaton as Daryl Poynter
 Kathy Baker as Charlie Standers
 Morgan Freeman as Craig
 M. Emmet Walsh as Richard Dirks
 Luca Bercovici as Lenny
 Tate Donovan as Donald
 Claudia Christian	as Iris
 Brian Benben as Martin
 Henry Judd Baker as Xavier
 J. David Krassner as Tiller
 Dakin Matthews as Bob
 Ben Piazza as Kramer
 Rachel Ryan as Karen Peluso

Reception
Clean and Sober received generally favorable reviews at the time. Roger Ebert praised the "superb supporting performances" and noted, "Although the subject matter of this film is commonplace in our society...the actual process of surrender and recovery is hardly ever the subject of films, maybe because it seems too depressing." Variety wondered if the film was "perhaps too grim."

In the Los Angeles Times, Sheila Benson wrote:[The film's] characters, particularly Keaton’s self-destructive Daryl and Kathy Baker’s seductive, wavering fellow addict Charlie, are daringly and consummately played. With anyone as scuzzy as Daryl--and to think of a character his equal you probably have to go back to Sweet Smell of Success--part of the fascination comes from seeing how deep the fault line runs. Caron and Carroll have managed the almost impossible; there is truly no reading Daryl until the last second of the last scene.
On Rotten Tomatoes, the film holds a 53% approval rating based on reviews from 15 critics, with an average score of 5.4/10. Audiences surveyed by CinemaScore gave the film a grade "B+" on scale of A to F.

Then-U.S. President Ronald Reagan viewed this film at Camp David on September 17, 1988 and wrote of it in his diary: "watched a long & not very entertaining movie about a man fighting drugs.".

Awards
Michael Keaton won the 1988 National Society of Film Critics Award for Best Actor for his performances in both Clean and Sober and Beetlejuice.

References

External links

 
 
 

1980s English-language films
1988 directorial debut films
1988 drama films
1988 films
American drama films
Films about alcoholism
Films about drugs
Films directed by Glenn Gordon Caron
Films scored by Gabriel Yared
Films set in Philadelphia
Films shot in New Jersey
Films shot in Pennsylvania
Films shot in Delaware
Imagine Entertainment films
Warner Bros. films
1980s American films